The Grand Prix-Aufgalopp is a Listed flat horse race in Germany open to thoroughbreds aged four years or older. It is run over a distance of 2,100 metres (about 1 mile and 2½ furlongs) at Cologne in April.

History
The event was formerly titled the Moormann-Rennen. It was usually contested over 1,800 or 2,000 metres at Dortmund.

The race was transferred to Cologne and renamed the Grand Prix-Aufgalopp in 1986. It was initially run over 1,900 metres and classed at Listed level. It was extended to 2,200 metres in 1990, and promoted to Group 3 status in 2007.

The Grand Prix-Aufgalopp became known as the Grand Prix Premiere in 2010. It was shortened to 2,100 metres in 2011. It returned to Listed level and reverted to its previous title in 2012.

Records
Most successful horse (2 wins):
 Dschingis Khan – 1965, 1966
 Revlon Boy – 1982, 1983
 Friedland – 1992, 1993

Leading jockey (5 wins):
 Fritz Drechsler – Prinz Aga (1959), Naretha (1963), Bacchus (1969), Basalt (1971), Lombard (1972)
 Terence Hellier – Germany (1995), Turbo Drive (1998), Pyromaniac (1999), Damiano (2000), Oriental Tiger (2008)

Leading trainer (14 wins):
 Heinz Jentzsch – Dschingis Khan (1965, 1966), Priamos (1968), Bacchus (1969), Basalt (1971), Lombard (1972), Schiwago (1973), Mirando (1974), Whip It Quick (1976, dead-heat), Aschanti (1979), Shepard (1981), El Arco (1984), Los Rinos (1990), Concepcion (1996)

Winners since 1980

 The 2006 edition was run over 2,400 metres.

Earlier winners
 1953: Almeido
 1954: Preusse
 1955: no race
 1956: Solotänzerin *
 1957: Adjag
 1958: Liperion
 1959: Prinz Aga
 1960: Feuereifer
 1961: Thiggo

 1962: Dornkaat
 1963: Naretha
 1964: Taunus
 1965: Dschingis Khan
 1966: Dschingis Khan
 1967: Goldbube
 1968: Priamos
 1969: Bacchus
 1970: Ernani

 1971: Basalt
 1972: Lombard
 1973: Schiwago
 1974: Mirando
 1975: Teotepec
 1976: My Brief / Whip It Quick **
 1977: Wladimir
 1978: Wasso
 1979: Aschanti

* The 1956 running was a 1,000-metre race for two-year-olds.** The 1976 race was a dead-heat and has joint winners.

See also
 List of German flat horse races

References
 Racing Post / siegerlisten.com:
 1995, 1996, 1997, 1998, 1999, 2000, 
 galopp-sieger.de – Grand Prix-Aufgalopp (ex Moormann-Rennen).
 horseracingintfed.com – International Federation of Horseracing Authorities – Grand Prix Premiere (2011).
 pedigreequery.com – Grand Prix-Aufgalopp – Köln.

Open middle distance horse races
Sport in Cologne
Horse races in Germany